Ying Rudi (born August 16, 1998) is a Chinese professional ice hockey player currently an unrestricted free agent. He most recently played with  HC Kunlun Red Star of the Kontinental Hockey League (KHL). Born in China, Ying first played hockey in Beijing, moving to the United States at age 9 to further his career. He returned to Beijing in 2016, becoming the first Chinese-born player to play in the KHL. Internationally he has represented China at both the junior and senior levels. Ying is also the son of actor Ying Da and the grandson of actor Ying Ruocheng.

Early life and education
Ying Rudi was born in Beijing on August 16, 1998, to Ying Da, a director and actor, and Liang Huan.

Playing career

Youth and junior
Ying played youth hockey in China for the Beijing Cubs of the Beijing Youth Hockey League (BYHL) before moving to the Chicago Mission of the High Performance Hockey League (HPHL) at age 9. Ying joined the Boston Junior Bruins U18 team in the Eastern Junior Elite Prospects League for the 2012–13 season, before transferring to play for the junior varsity team of Phillips Exeter Academy.

After two years at Exeter, Ying signed with the Toronto Patriots of the Ontario Junior Hockey League (OJHL), where he played for the remainder of the 2015–16 season.

Professional
On August 16, 2016, Ying signed a two-year contract with HC Kunlun Red Star of the Kontinental Hockey League (KHL). He was the first Chinese-born player to play in the KHL or NHL. After a year with the team, in which he acquired no points in 25 games, Ying was sent down to KRS Heilongjiang, the developmental minor-league affiliate team of HC Kunlun Red Star.

International play
Ying represented China as a 16-year-old at the 2014 IIHF World U18 Championship Division II. The youngest player on the team, Ying recorded seven points (five goals and two assists) in five games, the most out of any Chinese player at the tournament. He was named to the U18 Division II-B All Star Team.

Ying played for China again in 2015, where he again led the team in points, with seven (six goals and one assist). In 2016, Ying captained his team at the same tournament where he tallied three points (two goals and one assist) in four games.

In 2017, Ying captained the Chinese U20 National Team at the 2017 World Junior Ice Hockey Championships – Division III, where his team won second place. Despite China's loss in the finals, Ying gave a dominant individual performance, leading the tournament with 19 points (9 goals and 10 assists) in 5 games. He was awarded Best Forward of the Tournament, Best Player of Team China, as well as 2 Best Player of the Game awards.

Ying also participated at the 2017 Men's World Ice Hockey Championships and 2018 Men's World Ice Hockey Championships.

Personal life
Ying first began playing hockey at a Beijing mall, skating while his mother shopped. His parents decided to send him to the United States when he was nine to further his career. Initially, Ying lived in Chicago but later moved to the Boston area, where he studied at Fay School in Southborough and then entered Phillips Exeter Academy, a prep school known for its academics.

Ancestry
His great-great-grandfather Ying Lianzhi (1867–1926) was the founder of Takungpao and Fu Jen Catholic University. His great-great-grandmother Aisin Gioro Shuzhong was a member of the Qing dynasty royal family. His great-great-maternal grandfather Cai Rukai (1867–1923) was president of National Beiyang University. His great-grandfather Ying Qianli (1900–1969) was a professor at National Taiwan University and Fu Jen Catholic University. His great-grandmother Cai Baozhen was president of Beijing Children's Library. His grandmother was a translator and interpreter of Zhou Enlai. His grandfather Ying Ruocheng was a director, actor, playwright and vice minister of culture from 1986 to 1990. His aunt Ying Xiaole is a Chinese-American painter.

Career statistics

Regular season and playoffs

International

References

External links
 

1998 births
Living people
Chinese ice hockey forwards
HC Kunlun Red Star players
Ice hockey centres
KRS-BSU players
KRS Heilongjiang players
Manchu sportspeople
Sportspeople from Beijing
Phillips Exeter Academy alumni
Ice hockey players at the 2022 Winter Olympics
Olympic ice hockey players of China
Chinese expatriate ice hockey people
Expatriate ice hockey players in the United States
Chinese expatriate sportspeople in the United States